Iuliana is a feminine given name. It may refer to:

 Iuliana Gorea-Costin (born 1957), Moldovan diplomat and politician
 Iuliana Hobincu (born 1954), Romanian handball player
 Iuliana Măceșeanu (born 1981), Romanian épée fencer
 Iuliana Roxana Nucu (born 1980), Romanian retired volleyball player
 Iuliana Popa (born 1996), Romanian rower

See also
 Yuliana, a given name
 Juliana, a given name
 Uliana, a list of people with the given name Uliana or Ulyana

Romanian feminine given names